The Recovery Version is a modern English translation of the Bible from the original languages, published by  Living Stream Ministry, ministry of Witness Lee and Watchman Nee. It is the commonly used translation of Local Churches (affiliation).

The New Testament was published in 1985 with study aids, and was revised in 1991. Text-only editions of the New Testament and of the complete Bible became available in 1993 and 1999, respectively. The full study Bible was published in 2003. The name of the translation reflects the goal of its translators—to crystallize many biblical teachings and spiritual experiences that were lost or neglected but gradually recovered throughout church history, such as justification by faith.

Translation

The Recovery Version is a recent translation of the Bible from the revised 1990 edition of the Hebrew Scriptures, Biblia Hebraica Stuttgartensia, and the Nestle-Aland Greek text as found in Novum Testamentum Graece (26th edition). The translators believe that the understanding of the Bible has progressed in the past two thousand years, in part due to "philological and exegetical scholarship that makes more precise the meaning of the biblical words or phrases or practices" and in part due to an accumulation of Christian experience. This understanding forms the basis of this translation, with guidance from major authoritative English versions.

The Recovery Version claims to avoid biases and inaccurate judgments and to express the message of the Bible in English as accurately as possible. As such, it departs from traditional renderings in certain passages. Its translation is essentially literal/word-for-word/formal equivalent, seeking to preserve the wording of the original Hebrew or Greek text and the personal style of each biblical writer. Its translation is intended as transparent; interpretive ambiguities present in the original text are left unresolved in this translation for the readers to consider. The Recovery Version renders the Tetragrammaton as Jehovah throughout the Old Testament.

Study aids
 A subject line at the beginning of each book summarizes its spiritual significance.
 A detailed outline precedes each book and is embedded throughout the text, providing an overview of the structure of the book.
 Footnotes stress the translators' view of revelation of the truth, the spiritual light, and the supply of life more than history, geography, and persons. The New Testament footnotes were written by Lee, while those of the Old Testament were compiled from his literary corpus by the editorial team. Footnotes also indicate more literal (but less readable) translations, valid alternative translations, alternative ways of reading the original text, and alternative translations found in other English versions or in academic scholarship. Often, the clarity forfeited in a literal translation of the original text is addressed and compensated for in the footnotes. The Recovery Version contains over 15,000 footnotes.
 Marginal cross references lead to other verses with the same expressions and facts and to other matters related to the spiritual revelation in the Word.
 Maps show the ancient Near East in Old Testament times, Israel in Old Testament times, and the Holy Land in New Testament times and document the journeys of Paul.
 Charts present the characteristics of the different sections of the New Testament and organize details such as the prophetic seventy weeks in Daniel, the rapture of the believers, and the coming of Christ, in a visual timeline.

Textual comparison

Other languages
There are complete and partial editions of the Holy Bible Recovery Version in other languages, including Chinese (恢復本), French (Version Recouvrement), German (Wiedererlangungs-Übersetzung), Indonesian (Alkitab Versi Pemulihan), Japanese (回復訳), Korean (회복역), Portuguese (Versão Restauração), Russian (Восстановительный перевод), Spanish (Versión Recobro), Tagalog (Salin sa Pagbabawi), and Cebuano (Hubad Pahiuli).

See also
 The Lord's Recovery

Notes

References

External links
 The Holy Bible Recovery Version, English
 Free Recovery Version Bible
 Publications and Biographies of Watchman Nee and Witness Lee

Bible translations into English
Study Bibles